Munro College is a boarding school for boys in St Elizabeth, Jamaica. It was founded in 1856 as the Potsdam School (named for the city of Potsdam), a school for boys in St. Elizabeth as stipulated in the will of plantation owners Robert Hugh Munro and Caleb Dickenson. It was renamed Munro College during World War I as part of the general rejection of German names at the time, though the surrounding Potsdam district was not also renamed.

Munro College takes its name from one of its benefactors and was established in the fashion of the British public school. Several of the boarding houses take the names of other benefactors or illustrious alumni. The campus has its own chapel and magnificent views of the Caribbean Sea and Pedro Plains from its perch atop the peak of the Santa Cruz Mountains.
 
Munro College is reputed to have produced the most Rhode Scholars of any secondary school in the Caribbean. The most recent Rhodes Scholar from Munro College is Vincent F. Taylor (Jamaica and Magdalen 2013).
Munro College is currently the only all-boys boarding school in Jamaica.

Sixth form
Although established as a free school for poor boys, Munro used to admit Hampton girls into its 6th Form programme, but as of the new term of September 2010 this was discontinued, along with the classes previously offered at Hampton School. Munro College now has a shared campus with Hampton School where both set of sixth formers learn the arts.

Hampton School (Jamaica) was founded in 1858 as a sister school to Munro College in the Malvern, Saint Elizabeth (Jamaica). Hampton School is an all-girls boarding school.

Motto
The school's motto is In arce sitam quis occultabit — A city set upon a hill cannot be hid.

Notable alumni

Alumni include many prominent figures in Jamaican society; one of the most notable is former Prime Minister Donald Sangster. Others include former Ministers of Health: Kenneth McNeill, Herbert Eldemire, and Douglas Manley (brother to former Prime Minister Michael Manley); former Minister of Education Burchell Whiteman. Oraine Barrett, Morris Cargill, John Cyril Emerson Swaby and D. Basil Waite, former Opposition Spokesperson on Education are also a graduates of Munro College, as is popular journalist Lindy Delapenha, O.J., and Dr Derrick McKoy, CD, KC, lawyer, former Contractor-General and Attorney-General of Jamaica. Judge Ira DeCordova Rowe. Current Minister of State of Education Floyd Green; Oje Ken Ollivierre, popularly known as Protoje, is a contemporary reggae singer and songwriter from Jamaica.

Historic buildings
Four of Munro's buildings have been declared National Heritage Sites by Jamaica National Heritage Trust:
Coke Farquharson Building
The Chapel
Pearman Calder Building
The Staff Room
Baby Dorm

Other notable buildings on the campus includes:
Harrison Memorial Library
Biology Laboratory
The Old Observatory
Hospital Building 
Headmaster's House and Study
Old Armoury Building
Mr. Harle's House (now Guidance Counselor Office) 
Bell Tower
Richard B. Roper Auditorium
Munro College Post Office

Munro College was the first high school in the English-speaking Caribbean to have a grid-connected wind turbine energy source. The 225 kilowatt generator was commissioned in 1996, making Munro College a pioneer leader in renewable energy sources in the Caribbean.

References

External links
Aerial view
Photos:  

Educational institutions established in 1856
Schools in Jamaica
Buildings and structures in Saint Elizabeth Parish
1856 establishments in the British Empire